The following is a list of awards and nominations received by American actress and producer Reese Witherspoon. Among her numerous accolades, Witherspoon has won an Academy Award, BAFTA Award, and Golden Globe Award for her performance in Walk the Line. As a producer, Witherspoon won a Primetime
Emmy Award for the television series Big Little Lies.

Major associations

Academy Awards

BAFTA Awards

Critics Choice Awards

Golden Globe Awards

Primetime Emmy Awards

Screen Actors Guild Awards

Industry awards

Audience awards

Critic awards

Festival awards

Miscellaneous awards

Notes

References

External links
 
 

Witherspoon, Reese
Awards